Bay Street is a street in Toronto, Ontario, Canada.

Bay Street may also refer to:

Bay Street (entertainment complex), a shopping and entertainment centre in St. Julian's, Malta
Bay Street (Hamilton, Ontario), the financial centre of Hamilton, Ontario, Canada
Bay Street (Savannah, Georgia), a street in the United States
Bay Street (Victoria, British Columbia), an arterial road in Victoria, British Columbia, Canada
Bay Street Emeryville, a mall in Emeryville, San Francisco Bay Area, California, United States
Bay Street Film Festival, an independent film festival in Thunder Bay, Ontario, Canada
Bay Street station, a commuter rail station in Montclair, New Jersey, United States
International Plaza and Bay Street, a shopping mall in Tampa, Florida, United States